Geelong was a ship which owned by the Blue Anchor Line, and, after 1910, by P&O. She was constructed in 1904 by Barclay, Curle and Co. Ltd., at Glasgow, Scotland. When originally constructed, she had accommodation for 120 saloon and 200 third-class passengers, and also carried cargo.

In August 1909, Geelong participated in a search for her sister ship Waratah, which had disappeared without trace close to the South African coast, and was thought to be disabled and drifting.

During World War I, the Government of Australia leased Geelong for use as a troopship to transport the Australian Imperial Force to the Middle East and Europe. Designated HMAT A2 Geelong, the ship departed on her first voyage as a troopship on 22 September 1914, carrying 440 soldiers from Melbourne, Australia, consisting of the Australian Army′s 3rd Field Artillery Brigade, the 3rd Field Company Engineers, and some members of the 12th Infantry Battalion. She proceeded to Hobart, Australia, where she picked up another 912 soldiers, consisting of the 12th Infantry Battalion and the 3rd Light Horse Regiment. She left Hobart, bound for Egypt, on 20 October 1914.

Her second outbound trooping voyage left Adelaide, Australia, on 31 May 1915, transporting 1,264 soldiers of the 27th Infantry Battalion and the 7th Field Ambulance unit. She also picked up another 252 soldiers, who were reinforcements for various other units, from Fremantle, Australia, on 7 June 1915.

Her final departure from Australia was on 18 November 1915, carrying 1,362 soldiers, including the 32nd Infantry Battalion and some reinforcements for other units. There was no loss of life.

References 

1904 ships
Ships built on the River Clyde
Maritime incidents in 1916
Ships sunk in collisions
World War I shipwrecks in the Mediterranean Sea
Ships sunk with no fatalities